The International School of Indiana (ISI) is an independent private school in Indianapolis, Indiana. Since its founding in 1994, ISI has grown into a Pre-Kindergarten to 12th Grade school of more than 600 students. ISI is recognized as an IB World School, offering immersion programs for its students in the Spanish, French, and Mandarin Chinese languages, with students picking up a third language in Grade 6.

It was formerly affiliated with the French AEFE.

History
In 1991 an Indiana Humanities Council task force was established to address Indiana's position in a changing world.  The Task Force report, titled Indiana in a Changing World – A Strategy for Action, emphasized the need for Indiana to: 
 Participate in the world community and world economy
 Attract foreign companies and specialist employees
 Make Indiana students more internationally competitive
One of the report's major recommendations led to the creation of the International School of Indiana in 1994.

In July 2002, ISI was authorized to enroll Juniors and Seniors  into the IB Diploma Programme (DP), officially making the institution an IB School.

By 2004, ISI saw its first graduating class, consisting of 8 students.

2009 was a formative year for the school, where the IB Primary Years Programme (PYP) and Middle Years Programme (MYP) began to be incorporated into the curriculum in grades 1-5 and 6-10 respectively. ISI received certification for both programs in 2011, giving them the distinctive honor as the only school in the Midwestern United States to offer IB, MYP and PYP diplomas to its students. In addition to this, ISI announced the launch of its Mandarin Chinese immersion program for students in the same year.

In 2014, ISI was recognized by The Washington Post as one of the most challenging high schools in the country, due to the enduring nature of the IB Diploma Programme and the fact that all students are required to sit for these college-level exams at the end of their senior year.

The launch of the ONE ISI campaign in 2019 established the school's intention to unify the Lower and Upper School campuses by the 2021–22 academic year.

One of six like-minded international schools in the United States, ISI offers an integrated International Baccalaureate curriculum that is transferable to schools around the world.  The ISI curriculum imparts the problem-solving skills students need in the 21st-century economy.

Campus
The school campus is situated in the Butler-Tarkington neighborhood of Indianapolis, with the majority of the facilities situated on 60 wooded acres north of the Indianapolis Museum of Art. Grades 6 through 12 are located at 4330 Michigan Road, and pre-kindergarten through Grade 5 classes are held at the school's 49th Street building.

Curriculum
The school has an accredited IB Diploma Programme, Middle Years Programme, and the Primary Years Programme.

Extracurricular activities
Student groups and activities include the Aid to Congo Project, Habitat for Humanity, Literary Arts Society, Model United Nations, an Oxfam banquet, student government, the Timmy Foundation, the Gryphon Voices choir, art club, yearbook and sports.

Diversity

ISI is one of the most diverse private high schools in the state of Indiana, with the Indiana Department of Education reporting the following ethnic breakdown for the 2019–2020 school year: 44.5% White, 27.4% Asian, 9.1% Hispanic, 9.1% Black, 8.5% Multiracial, 0.6% Pacific Islander, and 0.6% Native American.

In addition to hosting a variety of different cultures across campus, ISI has always embraced pursuing an economically diverse student body, with 40% of students receiving financial aid of some kind in 2019.

Heads of School 
 Alain Weber: 1994-2007
 David Garner: 2007-2018
 Craig P. Anderson (interim): 2018 
 Elizabeth Head: 2019–Present

References

External links
 International School of Indiana

Education in Indianapolis
International Baccalaureate schools in Indiana
International schools in the United States
French international schools in the United States
Private schools in Indiana